Shaqir Stafa (born 23 April 1987) is an Albanian footballer who most recently played for Erzeni Shijak in the Albanian First Division.

Club career
Stafa played the majority of his career for hometown club Teuta, except for some loan spells and a stint at Kastrioti Krujë, whom he joined in summer 2014.
On 21 July 2015, he left Teuta Durrës and signed with Albanian First Division side Erzeni Shijak.

References

External links
 Profile - FSHF

1987 births
Living people
Footballers from Durrës
Albanian footballers
Albania under-21 international footballers
Association football defenders
KF Teuta Durrës players
FK Tomori Berat players
Besa Kavajë players
KS Kastrioti players
KF Erzeni players
Kategoria Superiore players
Kategoria e Parë players